Sophie Fjellvang-Sølling (born 25 April 1981) is a Danish freestyle skier. She competed for Denmark at the 2010 Winter Olympics in Women's ski cross. She was selected as her nation's flag bearer at the opening ceremonies.

References 

Danish female freestyle skiers
Olympic freestyle skiers of Denmark
Freestyle skiers at the 2010 Winter Olympics
1981 births
Living people